Ross Wylie (born 15 September 1991) is a Scottish racing driver. He started his motor racing career contesting the 2004 Mini Max Kart Championship, becoming a multiple kart champion in his native Scotland over the next eight years, before moving up to car racing in 2012.

Having competed in the Volkswagen Scirocco R-Cup and Volkswagen UK Racing Cup in 2013, he won the British GT4 Championship the following year, co-driving the Beechdean Motorsport Aston Martin Vantage with Jake Giddings.

Selected as a McLaren GT "Young Driver" in 2015, Ross spent that year and the next competing in the British GT Championship, challenging for outright race wins with Von Ryan Racing, driving a McLaren 650S GT3 followed by a Motorbase Performance Aston Martin Vantage GT3 in 2016.

In 2017, Ross won the Britcar Endurance Championship outright in the MJC Furlonger-prepared Ferrari 458 GT, taking 10 overall podiums, including 4 wins.

Ross contested the 2018 Britcar series with FF Corse, co-driving a Ferrari 458 GT3 with David Mason. He completed the year by winning the Sprint S1 category, claiming 13 class podiums, including 4 class wins. Ross is also an ARDS-qualified (Association of Racing Driver Schools) instructor and a freelance driving specialist. Having been nominated as a BRDC (British Racing Drivers’ Club) Rising Star in 2013, he was selected as a BRDC "SuperStar" two years later.

During 2019 Ross Wylie completed 7 rounds of the Britcar Endurance Championship, securing 3 class poles and 6 top-four placings. He also competed once in the GT Cup Championship (GTC class FF Corse Ferrari 488 Challenge, class podium) and achieved a top-five finish in all four rounds of the Porsche Carrera Cup GB that he contested. 

In 2020 Ross returned to the Porsche Carrera Cup GB with In2Racing, and competed in 16 races, finishing the season 7th overall. Ross also contested 6  Britcar Endurance Championship races with SB Race Engineering  Ferrari 488 to secure the C2 Class title, second overall.

The 2021 season saw Ross competing across four domestic championships. At the wheel of three different cars prepared by SB Race Engineering (Ferrari 488, Brabham BT62 Competition and McLaren MP4-12C Can Am) he took the GTO title in the GT Cup, with nine podiums, six class wins, six fastest laps and one overall victory. He supported that with six appearances in the Porsche Carrera Cup GB for Valluga Racing, and a race apiece in the Britcar Endurance Championship (a C2 class win ) and the British GT Championship (3rd in GT3SA), both with Simon Green Motorsport.

Early career 
Ross Wylie was born in Thornhill, in the Dumfries and Galloway region of Scotland in 1991, and began his motor racing career aged 13 in karts. His first season, in the 2004 Mini Max Kart Championship, was followed by three years contesting the Scottish Junior Rotax Max Kart Championship, culminating in his taking the title in 2007. That same year he took the West of Scotland Club Kart Championship and finishing third in the Motors TV Karting Challenge.

His dominance of Scottish junior karting continued into 2008, when Wylie retained his West of Scotland Club title, but began an equally effective move south of the border, contesting and winning the 2008 Rotax Cup as well as the Junior Rotax Max "British Stars of Tomorrow" Kart Championship. In a busy year, he also finished third in the Super One National Junior Max Kart Championship.

For another three seasons Wylie continued to be a front-runner in British junior karting, winning the Rotax Winter Cup and British Open Kart Championship in 2010, and then the Rotax Max Gold Cup in 2011.

Cars 
In 2012 Wylie made his circuit racing debut, contesting the Celtic Speed Mini Cooper Cup, and securing six podiums, two wins, two poles and four fastest laps. This not only earned him the title of Knockhill Young Saloon Car Driver of the Year, but also the SMRC (Scottish Motor Racing Club) Ecurie Ecosse Hubcap Trophy. This prestigious award; a genuine winged wheel-nut from the Ecurie Ecosse 1956 Le Mans-winning D-Type Jaguar, is given annually to the most promising Young Scottish Driver of the Year. Former winners include Paul di Resta, Dario Franchitti, Allan McNish and David Coulthard.

The following season, 2013, saw Wylie step up to the Volkswagen Scirocco R-Cup, where he closed the year by taking 5th overall and the Junior Cup, securing five podiums, including one win and one pole position. He dovetailed that by claiming 6th in the Volkswagen UK Racing Cup (5 podiums, 3 wins and 2 poles) for SlideSports. As a consequence, Wylie was selected as the BRDC "Rising Star" of 2013.

2014 became a standout year for Wylie. Signed to Beechdean Motorsport, he contested the ten-round British GT Championship with fellow Briton Jake Giddings.  The pairing won the GT4 class at the opening round at Oulton Park, and followed this with seven further class podiums, including two more wins (at Spa and Brands Hatch) with 2 pole position starts. They clinched the title at the final round at Donington Park. Selected as the McLaren GT "Young Driver" of the Year, Wylie joined the McLaren Driver Academy programme alongside Andrew Watson, and competed in the 2015 British GT Championship, racing a McLaren 650S GT3 for Von Ryan Racing. Wylie finished the season second in the Silver Cup (15th overall) with 6 top-ten finishes from nine races. He was subsequently invited to participate in the coveted BRDC "SuperStar" scheme.

Wylie returned to British GT in 2016, joining Motorbase Performance to partner fellow Scot Phil Dryburgh in the team's single Aston Martin V12 Vantage GT3. The duo secured five top-ten finishes from nine starts to complete the year 11th in the Championship. Wylie then rounded off the year on a high, finishing the demanding Gulf 12 Hours in Abu Dhabi with 5th overall, sharing the SlideSports Porsche Cayman GT4 with co-drivers Wayne Marrs and David Fairbrother.

After three seasons in British GT, Wylie made the move to the Britcar Endurance Series for 2017. Co-driving a Ferrari 458 GT prepared by MJC Furlonger with Witt Gamski, the Scot took 10 podiums overall, including four wins, to secure the title in the final round at Brands Hatch. Class victory in both the day's races gave the duo a 19-point advantage as the series ended. It was Wylie's fourth British national title.  Concurrent with his Britcar campaign, Wylie also competed with SlideSports in the Porsche Carrera Cup GB, missing two Britcar rounds to focus on his Porsche programme. In the fifteen-race series, he finished in the top ten in 8 out of the 12 races he completed to secure 11th overall. He was the best-placed Rookie driver of the season, and made his Le Mans circuit debut when the Carrera Cup acted as support to the 24 Hours in June.

2018 season 
In the 2018 season Wylie once again competed in the Britcar Dunlop Endurance Championship (Sprint Category), partnering gentleman-driver David Mason in the GT3-specification Ferrari 458 prepared by FF Corse. The pair finished second overall (Sprint S1 Class 2nd) in the first race of the opening round at Rockingham, with Wylie setting fastest lap, and then third overall (Class 3rd) in the weekend's second race. Second in the Sprint S1 class (again with fastest lap to Wylie) in both Silverstone races was followed by a brace of second places (4th and 7th overall, with fastest lap set by Wylie in both races) at Oulton Park. In July Britcar arrived at Donington Park, where Wylie was again the fastest man on track in Race 1 before retirement, but was back on the podium (2nd in S1, 3rd overall) in Race 2, despite starting 28th. In early September Britcar arrived at Snetterton, where the Wylie/Mason pairing took their first S1 class win (2nd overall) in the day's opening Sprint race, repeating this in the second (10th overall), with Wylie fastest in the 25-lap evening race. The season's penultimate round, back at Silverstone in October, saw the duo taking S1 class wins on both races (2nd and 1st overall) with fastest laps to Wylie in each. In the final meeting of the season, Wylie and Mason again took top honours in the first Sprint race (second overall, Wylie setting fastest lap), and followed that with another podium (third) in the weekend's second race. Wylie and Mason ended the season as S1 Class winners, second overall in the Sprint Category Championship.

In July 2018, the Scot fulfilled a dream by demonstrating Allan McNish's 1998 Le Mans-winning Porsche 911 GT1 at the Goodwood Festival of Speed. Wylie cites McNish as one of his childhood inspirations.

2019 season 

At the beginning of 2019, Mason and Wylie's season did not get off to a great start, despite qualifying first in Class 2 and third overall, the only managed to finish eleventh and fourth in class. Round two on the GP style of Silverstone was more in favour of the FF Corse duo, they finished fifth in race one and third in class, race two resulted in a Ferrari 488 1-2-3, with veteran Mason and Wylie finishing third overall and third in Class 2. At Brands Hatch, they qualified first overall and once again finished fifth overall and second in class. Race two was worse for the pair, they finished twelfth unfortunately. Donington, round four, became their worst outing of the season. They had begun to lead the race from second on the grid. They lead most of the race, unfortunately, ten laps shy of the end of the race, they collided with the TCR-spec SEAT Leon of Ashley Woodman, which resulted in both cars retiring from the race. The car had received some damage to the front left and did not make it to start race two.

2020 season 
Ross Wylie had a successful season of motor racing in 2020, despite the pandemic. He rounded off the year by finishing sixth and fifth respectively in the final two rounds of the Porsche Carrera Cup GB at Brands Hatch, thereby securing 7th overall in the championship. Having started the first of these two 30-minute races from 11th on the 18-car grid, he worked through a wet race to finish sixth at the flag. The next day, he followed this with fifth in the dry to round off his Porsche season with a total of nine top-six placings, including two podiums and one outright win at Thruxton.

In the Dunlop Britcar Endurance Championship Wylie took C2 class honours for the third time in four years, second overall, and just five points behind the outright winners despite only contesting six of the year's ten races. Partnered by Paul Bailey in the SB Race Engineering Ferrari 488 Challenge, Ross netted six top-three class finishes, including three wins, as well as setting four fastest race laps from six race starts.

Ross also contested one race in the 2020 GT Cup Championship, claiming a class win and fastest lap, and entered a single round of the British GT Championship, crossing the line fourth in class after claiming GTC 'pole' but delayed by a broken wishbone early in the race. Both events saw Wylie co-driving a Ferrari 488 Challenge prepared by Simon Green Motorsport.

2021 season 
Wylie contested no less than four different British race series in 2021, emerging triumphant in the GT Cup Championship, where he took the GTO title alongside Paul Bailey. The duo shared three cars prepared by SB Race Engineering during the course of the season: a Ferrari 488 Challenge, Brabham BT62 Competition and McLaren MP4-12C Can Am. Wylie also made single appearances with Simon Green Motorsport in both the British GT Championship (Lamborghini Huracán) and Britcar Endurance Championship (Ferrari 488 Challenge), co-driving on each occasions with Lucky Khera. In between this busy schedule, he competed in six out of the eight races scheduled for the Porsche Carrera Cup GB in 2021.

Racing record

Complete Britcar results 
(key) (Races in bold indicate pole position in class – 1 point awarded just in first race) (Races in italics indicate fastest lap in class – 1 point awarded all races)

Partial GT Cup Championship results
(key) (Races in bold indicate pole position in class – 1 point awarded just in first race; races in italics indicate fastest lap in class – 1 point awarded all races;-

† Wylie was ineligible for points as he was an invitation entry.

References 

1991 births
Living people
Scottish racing drivers
Sports car racing
Britcar drivers
British GT Championship drivers
Porsche Carrera Cup GB drivers